Events from the year 1990 in Denmark.

Incumbents
 Monarch – Margrethe II
 Prime minister – Poul Schlüter

Events
2 February – Squatters are after four years finally evicted from the Black Horse, a former roadside inn, on Vesterbrogade in Copenhagen.

Undated

The arts

Film
 26 March – At the 62nd Academy Awards, Kaspar Rostrup's Waltzing Regitze is among the five films nominated for Best Foreign Language Film but the Oscar goes to the Italian Cinema Paradiso.

Literature

Music

Sports

Badminton
 8–14 April – With five gold medals, one silver medal and three bronze medals, Denmark finishes as the best nation at the 12th European Badminton Championships in Moscow, Soviet Union.
 24 28 March  1990 Denmark Open
Poul-Erik Høyer Larsen wins gold in men's single by defeating Morten Frost in the final
 Lotte Olsen and Dorte Kjær win gold in women's double by defeating  Gillian Gowers and Gillian Clark in the final.
 Thomas Lund and Pernille Dupont win gold in mixed double by defeating Henrik Svarrer and Marlene Thomsen in the final.

Cycling
 24 March – Søren Lilholt wins 1990 E3 Prijs Vlaanderen.
 14 October – Rolf Sørensen wins 1990 Paris–Tours.

Soccer
 Summer of 1992 wins Denmark a Europe tornnement for soccer.

Births
 14 March – Şaban Özdoğan, footballer
 23 April – Mathias "Zanka" Jørgensen, football player
 1 June – Kennie Chopart, footballer
 11 July – Caroline Wozniacki, tennis player
 22 September – Peter Ankersen, footballer

Deaths
 19 June – Steen Eiler Rasmussen, architect and writer (born 1898)

See also
1990 in Danish television

References

 
Denmark
Years of the 20th century in Denmark
1990s in Denmark